Fangamer is an American video game merchandising company and game publisher based in Tucson, Arizona. Fangamer was originally spun out from Starmen.net, an EarthBound online forum. It operates an online store that sells licensed indie game merchandise items such as hats, pins, vinyl records, t-shirts and other products. In recent years the company has also begun publishing physical editions of independent video games.

History 
Starmen.net, an online forum, began selling T-shirts and mugs in 2007 as a way to pay for the server costs of the site. One of the creators of the site stated, "Well, the ads weren't paying the bills, so we thought, 'What if we took the kinda-crappy print-on-demand stuff we’re making on CafePress, and we did it at a much higher-quality?'". The next year, Fangamer was launched with an initial offering of "two t-shirts, a pin set, and a mug" based on EarthBound. After the success of this initial run of merchandise, Fangamer started to expand into creating items for other games such as Phoenix Wright and Chrono Trigger. To avoid infringement of the various video game properties they were creating items for at the time, the site avoided using designs with any copyrighted symbols. Fangamer also produced physical copies of Starmen.net's unofficial player's guide for Mother 3.

In the mid-2010's Fangamer became known as a fulfillment partner for video game Kickstarters, providing merchandise for the campaigns of games such as Broken Age and Bloodstained: Ritual of the Night. After partnering with Toby Fox to create merchandise for Undertale, the site experienced a higher number of sales, with a cofounder saying "I thought there was a glitch in Shopify... Undertale had become just an incredible phenomenon.”. This success allowed Fangamer to expand into acquiring licenses for other video game proprieties, going on to create merchandise for games such as Hollow Knight and Banjo-Kazooie.

Games published

References 

Video game websites